Abdullah Abkar Mohammed (born 1 January 1997) is a Saudi sprinter competing in the 100 metres.  He represented Saudi Arabia in the 60 metres at the 2016 IAAF World Indoor Championships, reaching the semifinals.  His 10.04 personal best set at the Mt. SAC Relays on 16 April 2016 is the Asian Junior record.

Competition record

1Did not start in the semifinals
2Disqualified in the final

Personal bests
Outdoor
100 metres – 10.03	(+1.2 m/s), Stade Charléty, Paris (FRA)	30 June 2018
Indoor
60 metres – 6.64 (Portland 2016)

External links
 
 

Living people
1997 births
Saudi Arabian male sprinters
Athletes (track and field) at the 2016 Summer Olympics
Athletes (track and field) at the 2018 Asian Games
Olympic athletes of Saudi Arabia
World Athletics Championships athletes for Saudi Arabia
Asian Games competitors for Saudi Arabia
21st-century Saudi Arabian people
20th-century Saudi Arabian people